Cranford may refer to:

Cranford (novel), an 1853 novel by Elizabeth Gaskell
Cranford (TV series), a BBC television adaptation of Cranford and other works by Elizabeth Gaskell

Cranford may also refer to the following places:

Cranford, Donegal, Ireland
Cranford, London, England
Cranford, New Jersey, United States
Cranford (NJT station), a New Jersey Transit railroad station
Cranford, Northamptonshire, England, which comprises two settlements
Cranford St Andrew, Northamptonshire, England
Cranford St John, Northamptonshire, England
Cranford, Alberta, Canada

See also
Craanford, Republic of Ireland